Oowekyala , also Ooweekeeno and ’Wuik̓ala in the language itself, is a dialect (or a sublanguage) of Heiltsuk-Oowekyala, a Northern Wakashan language spoken around Rivers Inlet and Owikeno Lake in the Central Coast region of the Canadian province of British Columbia, spoken by the Wuikinuxv, whose government is the Wuikinuxv Nation.

The name is also spelled Wuikala, Wuikenukv, Oweekeno, Wikeno, Owikeno, Oowekeeno, Oweekano, Awikenox, Oowek'yala, Oweek'ala.

Sounds

Consonants

The 45 consonants of Oowekyala:

Phonologically, affricates are treated as stops, and nasals and approximants are treated as sonorants.

Vowels

Oowekyala has phonemic short, long, and glottalized vowels:

Phonotactics

Oowekyala, like Nuxálk (Bella Coola), allows long sequences of obstruents, as in the following 7-obstruent word:

   'the invisible one here-with-me will be short'   (Howe 2000: 5)
 [kxlqs] kxlqsłcxv - you struck a match for me

References

External links
 The Heiltsuk-Oweek'ala Language
 Bibliography of Materials on the Heiltsuk Language
 The Wakashan Languages
 map of Northwest Coast First Nations (including Oowekyala, shown as "Oowekeeno")

Bibliography

 Boas, Franz. (1928). Bella Bella texts. Columbia University contributions to anthropology (No. 5).
 Boas, Franz. (1932). Bella Bella tales. Memoirs of the American Folklore Society (No. 25).
 Hanuse, R., Sr.; Smith, H.; & Stevenson, D. (Eds.) (1983?). The Adjee and the Little Girl.  Rivers  Inlet, BC: Oowekyala Language Project.
 Hilton, Suzanne; & Rath, John C. (1982). Oowekeeno oral traditions. Ottawa: National Museums  of Canada.
 Howe, Darin. (1998). Aspects of Heiltsuk laryngeal phonology. Ms., University of British Columbia.
 Howe, Darin M. (2000). Oowekyala segmental phonology. (Doctoral dissertation, University of Ottawa). 
 Johnson, S.; Smith, H.; & Stevenson, D. (1983?). What time is it? Rivers Inlet, BC: Oowekyala  Language Project.
 Johnson, S.; Smith, H.; & Stevenson, D. (1983?). Fishing at Rivers Inlet. Rivers Inlet, BC: Oowekyala Language Project.
 Johnson, S.; Smith, H.; & Stevenson, D. (1983?). Qaquthanugva uikala. Rivers Inlet, BC: Oowekyala  Language Project.
 Johnson, S.; Smith, H.; & Stevenson, D. (1983?). Sisa'kvimas. Rivers Inlet, BC: Oowekyala Language Project.
 Johnson, S.; Smith, H.; & Stevenson, D. (1983?). ’Katemxvs ’Wuik’ala. Rivers Inlet, BC: Oowekyala  Language Project.
 Johnson, S.; Smith, H.; & Stevenson, D. (1984?). Oowekyala words. Rivers Inlet, BC: Oowekyala  Language Project.
 Lincoln, Neville J.; & Rath, John C. (1980). North Wakashan comparative root list. Ottawa: National Museums of Canada.
 Poser, William J. (2003). The status of documentation for British Columbia native languages. Yinka Dene Language Institute Technical Report (No. 2). Vanderhoof, British Columbia: Yinka Dene Language Institute.
 Rath, John C. (1981). A practical Heiltsuk-English dictionary. Canadian Ethnology Service, Mercury Series paper (No. 75). Ottawa: National Museum of Man.
 Stevenson, David. (1980). The Oowekeeno people: A cultural history. Ottawa, Ontario: National Museum of Man (now Hull, Quebec: Museum of Civilization). (Unpublished).
 Stevenson, David. (1982). The ceremonial names of the Oowekeeno people of Rivers Inlet. Ottawa, Ontario: National Museum of Man (now Hull, Quebec: Museum of Civilization). (Unpublished).
 Storie, Susanne. (Ed.). (1973). Oweekano Stories. (Special Collections: E99). Victoria: British Columbia Indian Advisory Committee.
 Windsor, Evelyn W. (1982). Oowekeeno oral traditions as told by the late chief Simon Walkus, Sr. Hilton, S.; & Rath, J. C. (Eds.). Mercury series (No. 84). Ottawa: National Museum of Man.

Wuikinuxv
Wakashan languages
Indigenous languages of the Pacific Northwest Coast
First Nations languages in Canada
Central Coast of British Columbia
Endangered Wakashan languages